Hesperapis larreae is a solitary, ground-nesting bee in the family Melittidae

References

Melittidae